Bipes is a genus of amphisbaenians found only in Mexico, the sole living member of the family Bipedidae. They are carnivorous, burrowing reptiles, but unlike other species of amphisbaenians, they possess two stubby forelimbs placed far forward on the body. They also retain an almost complete pectoral girdle. The shovel-like limbs are used to scrape away soil while burrowing, in a manner similar to a mole. Evidence for their occurrence in the United States is reviewed by Somma (1993).

References

Further reading
Latreille PA (1801). In: Sonnini CS, Latreiile PA (1801). Histoire naturelle des reptiles, avec figures desinées d'après nature; Tome II. Premiere partie. Quadrupèdes et bipèdes ovipares. Paris: Crapalet. 332 pp. (Bipes, pp. 90–96.)
Taylor EH (1951). "Concerning Oligocene Amphisbaenid Reptiles". University of Kansas Science Bulletin 34 (9): 521–579. (Bipedidae, p. 522.)
Somma, Louis A. (1993). "Do Worm Lizards Occur in Nebraska?" Nebraska Herpetological Newsletter 12 (2): 1–10

External links 
 https://web.archive.org/web/20090514074919/http://www.jcvi.org/reptiles/families/bipedidae.php

Bipes (lizard)
Lizard genera
Endemic reptiles of Mexico
Taxa named by Pierre André Latreille